Future Earth is an international research program which aims to build knowledge about the environmental and human aspects of Global change, and to find solutions for sustainable development. It aims to increase the impact of scientific research on sustainable development.

Future Earth is an interdisciplinary research programme bringing together natural and social sciences, as well as the humanities, engineering and law, and focused on designing and producing research together with stakeholders from outside the scientific community.

Mission and principles

Future Earth's mission is to "build and connect global knowledge to intensify the impact of research and find new ways to accelerate sustainable development". Its vision is for "people to thrive in a sustainable and equitable world". To do this, Future Earth aims to mobilize the international community of global environmental science researchers to: 
 Inspire and create interdisciplinary science relevant to major global sustainability challenges
 Deliver products and services that society needs to meet these challenges
 Co-design and co-produce solutions-oriented science, knowledge and innovation for global sustainable development
 Build capacity among scholars world-wide

History

Future Earth was launched in June 2012, at the UN Conference on Sustainable Development (Rio+20).

A globally distributed consortium was appointed as the Secretariat of Future Earth in July 2014, with offices in Montreal (Canada), Stockholm (Sweden), Colorado (USA), Tokyo (Japan) and Paris (France).

Amy Luers is the Executive Director.

Projects

Scientific research and synthesis in Future Earth is carried out by a number of international networks, known as ‘global research projects’, many of which were launched under the umbrella of the existing four global environmental change programmes, DIVERSITAS, the International Geosphere-Biosphere Programme (IGBP), the International Human Dimensions Programme (IHDP) and the World Climate Research Programme (WCRP). Some further projects arose out of the Earth System Science Partnership (ESSP). A formal process for the affiliation of these projects into Future Earth began in 2014. The projects are:

 AIMES (Analysis, Integration and Modelling of the Earth System)
 bioDISCOVERY
 bioGENESIS
 CCAFS – Climate Change, Agriculture and Food Security, a collaboration among the CGIAR Consortium of International Agricultural Research Centers
 oneHEALTH
 ecoSERVICES
 ESG – Earth System Governance
 GCP – Global Carbon Project
 GLP – Global Land Project
 GMBA – Global Mountain Biodiversity Assessment
 GWSP – Global Water System Project
 IGAC – International Global Atmospheric Chemistry
 IHOPE – Integrated History and Future of People on Earth
 ILEAPS – Integrated Land Ecosystem-Atmosphere Processes Study
 IMBER – Integrated Marine Biogeochemistry and Ecosystem Research
 IRG – Integrated Risk Governance Project
 LOICZ – Land-Ocean Interactions in the Coastal Zone
 MAIRS – Monsoon Asia Integrated Regional Study
 PAGES – Past Global Changes
 PECS – Programme on Ecosystem Change and Society
 SOLAS – Surface Ocean-Lower Atmosphere Study

See also
 International Council for Science
 Great acceleration

References

External links
Official website

La sostenibilidad es insuficiente (El País article - Spanish national press)

Research
Research projects